Mythic humanoids are mythological creatures that are part human, or that resemble humans through appearance or character. Each culture has different mythical creatures that come from many different origins. A major chunk of these creatures are humanoids. They are often able to talk and in many stories they guide the hero on their journey. They are said to come before the creation of gods and goddesses.

Categories of mythic humanoids
The multitude of mythic humanoids can be divided into four categories.

Human skinned humanoids

These humanoids can pass unnoticed in human society if their attributes are small enough to go unnoticed. Their ears may be slightly misshaped, their eyes may not line up, or their height may not measure up, but their difference in appearance can be attributed to genetic mistakes or mutation. Sometimes they live separated from society, live in alternative realities, or appear at night or under specific circumstances. This category includes witches, elves, fairies, nymphs, and house spirits.

Monster skinned humanoids

Portions of these humanoids are clearly not of human make. They may have drastic differences in skin color and eye type and may have scales, fur, claws, and tails. The average person may find them quite unpleasant and untrustworthy because they are not entirely human. An example is the Kyubi no kitsune, found in Japanese folklore.

Monstrous humanoids

These humanoids are likely to instill fear and revulsion. They may walk, talk, and think like a human, but they are obviously not human. Some examples of these monsters are demons and vampires.

Temporary form humanoids

These are creatures that may temporarily disguise or transform into a human shape but have entirely different true forms.

Human skinned

 Arkan Sonney Fairy creature resembling a pig.
 Astomi No mouths mythical humanoids.
 Bannik Slavic bathhouse spirit.
 Brownie Scottish household spirit
 Changeling Fae child left in place of a human child stolen by the fae.
 Ciguapa Women who live in the mountains of the Dominican Republic.
 Clurichaun Irish fairy resembling a leprechaun.
 Diwata Philippine deities/spirits.
 Dökkálfar Scandinavian dark elves.
 Domovoi Protective house spirit in Slavic folklore.
 Dryad A tree nymph or tree spirit.
 Dullahan Irish fairy, the headless rider.
 Dwarf Small human-shaped being that dwells in mountains and in the earth.
 Ebu Gogo Human-like creatures in Indonesian mythology.
 Empusa (Or Empousa) A shape-shifting female with a copper leg in Greek Mythology
 Elf Supernatural being in Germanic mythology and folklore.
 Erinyes Greek Furies, female chthonic deities of vengeance.
 Fairy Mythical being or legendary creature in European folklore, also known as fae or fair folk among many other names.
 Fiura Evil creature in Chilean mythology, a small, nasty woman with large breasts.
 Giant Monsters of human appearance but prodigious size and strength.
 Gnome Typically said to be a small humanoid that lives underground.
 Gremlin A creature commonly depicted as mischievous and mechanically oriented.
 Gwisin General term for a Korean ghost.
 Haltija A spirit, gnome, or elf-like creature in Finnish mythology that guards, helps, or protects something or somebody.
 Hulder Seductive forest creature found in Scandinavian folklore.
 Jinn Genie-like beings.
 Kabouter The Dutch word for gnome or leprechaun.
 Kalku A Chiloe and Mapuche mythological sorcerer who controls crows and contains dark magic and negative powers.
 Kallikantzaroi A malevolent goblin.
 Kikimora Female house spirit in Slavic (especially Eastern) mythology.
 Klabautermann (Klabautermannikin, Kaboutermannikin)  A water kobold or nix.
 Knocker Mischievous spirits.
 Korrigan Breton dwarves or fairies.
 Lares Guardian deities of ancient Rome.
 Leanan sídhe A fairy-like being from Irish folklore.
 Leprechaun Little bearded men.
 Ljósálfar Norse light elves.
 Menehune Small people who live in hidden Hawaiian valleys.
 Monaciello Little men dressed as monks.
 Monopod One-legged mythical humanoids.
 Naiad A type of water nymph.
 Nereid Female water spirits of Greece.
 Nix German shape-shifting water spirit.
 Norse dwarves Small Norse humanoids.
 Nuno Dwarf-like creature in Philippine mythology.
 Nymph Female nature spirits.
 Oberon (Fairy King) King of the fairies.
 Oceanid Sea nymphs, the daughters of Oceanus and Tethys.
 Pixie Benign fairy-like beings.
 Pombero Mythical humanoid creature of small stature being from Guaraní mythology.
 Rusalka Slavic water spirits.
 Sandman A man who puts people to sleep and brings good dreams by sprinkling magical sand onto the eyes of sleeping humans.
 Satyr / Satyress Ithyphallic men with goat-like features.
 Seelie a Scottish term meaning "happy" or "blessed," used in several fairy names.
 Sidhe An Irish race of fae that made their homes in mounds.
 Slavic fairies Supernatural beings in Slavic folklore.
 Spriggan A grotesquely ugly mischievous fairy.
 Sprite Fairy, ghost and/or elf-like creatures
 Succubus Seductive demon, the feminine counterpart to an Incubus.
 Svartalfar Norse for "black elves".
 Sylph A mythological air spirit.
 Siren Beautiful yet dangerous creatures, who lured nearby sailors with their enchanting music and voices to shipwreck on the rocky coast of their island.
 Tennin Spiritual beings found in Japanese Buddhism that are similar to western angels, nymphs or fairies.
 Titania (Fairy Queen) A character from Shakespeare's play A Midsummer Night's Dream.
 Tomte A Scandinavian creature associated with the winter solstice and the Christmas season.
 Trauco Dwarf or goblin-like creature that inhabits the woods of Chiloé.
 Undine Water nymph.
 Valkyrie Female figure who chooses who lives and who dies in battle.
 Vampire A being from folklore who subsists by feeding on the life essence (generally in the form of blood) of the living.
 Vetter Nature spirits.
 Vila (fairy) Slavic version of nymphs, with the power of the wind.
 Xana An extraordinarily beautiful female creature in Asturian mythology.

Monster skinned
 Adlet Dog-like humanoids in Inuit folklore.
 Asterius Two sacred kings of Crete, as well as a river and its god in Argos.
 Banshee A female spirit in Irish mythology
 Blafard Albinos long surmised to be the result of some kind of simian crossbreeding.
 Boggart Household spirits or genius loci.
 Bugbear A type of hobgoblin comparable to the bogeyman.
 Centaur / Kentaurides Men and women with the lower bodies of horses.
 Cynocephalus Dog-headed humans.
 Deer Woman Native American spirit of fertility.
 Demon A well-known mythical humanoid associated with the devil.
 Ent Nature spirits that resemble trees.
 Fairy Spirits commonly depicted as having beautiful insectoid wings.
 Faun Humans with the horns and lower bodies of goats.
 Garuda Vishnu's bird-like mount.
 Goblin Small, grotesque humanoids.
 Gorgon Female creatures commonly depicted with snake hair and other beastly features.
 Harpy Female creatures with bird wings.
 Jengu Beautiful, mermaid-like creatures.
 Imp A mischievous mythological being similar to a fairy or goblin.
 Incubus Seductive demon, usually male but can be female. The dominant counterpart to a Succubus.
 Karnabo an elephant-trunked humanoid in Ardennes folklore
 Kobold Shapeshifting German spirits.
 Lamia A beautiful, child-eating demon.
 Lich Undead magicians and kings which strove for eternal life.
 Manticore A creature with a man's head, a lion's body, bat wings, and a scorpion tail.
 Mermaid / Merman Women and men with the lower bodies of fish.
 Minotaur A human with the head and sometimes legs of a bull.
 Mothman A winged, legendary man with the features of a moth.
 Nāga Humans with the lower halves of snakes.
 Ogre / Ogress Large, grotesque humanoids.
 Orc Humanoids with grey skin and tusks.
 Pan A god with the horns and legs of a goat.
 Pookha / Puck A domestic and nature sprite, demon, or fairy.
 Redcap A malevolent, murderous dwarf, goblin, elf or fairy found in Border Folklore.
 Salamander Fire spirit or elemental.
 Satyr Ithyphallic men with goat-like features.
 Siren Dangerous women-headed birds that lured sailors to their death with their voices.
 Sphinx A creature with the body of a lion and the head of a human.
 Tikbalang Tall, bony creatures with the features of a horse.
 Troll Large, grotesque humanoids.
 Triton The Greek messenger of the sea and a son of Poseidon 
 Vanara a man-ape species with human intelligence in Hindu scriptures 
 Yacuruna Hairy beings with deformed feet and their heads turned backwards.

Monstrous humanoids
 Abarimon A savage race of people with backwards feet.
 Ala A female demon that brings bad weather to farms.
 Aswang Shapeshifting Philippine ghouls.
 Baba Yaga A legendary witch who flies around in a mortar, wields a pestle, and lives/travels in a chicken-legged hut.
 Black Annis A blue-faced crone or witch with iron claws.
 Blemmyes A headless man with facial features on their chests.
 Boogeyman A featureless, androgynous creature used by adults to frighten children into good behavior.
 Bunyip Large, water-dwelling creatures.
 Caliban The subhuman son of the witch Sycorax.
 Cyclopes Grotesque, one-eyed humanoids.
 Draugar Undead creatures that guard their burial mounds.
 Gargoyle Carved or formed grotesques said to scare away demons.
 Ghoul Evil flesh-eating spirits.
 Giant / Giantess Extremely large humanoids.
 Gigantes Extremely large humanoids.
 Goblin Small, grotesque humanoids.
 Gorgons Female creatures commonly depicted with beastly features.
 Gremlins Grotesque, humanoid creatures who love to sabotage machinery.
 Grendel A giant monster.
 Hag A wizened old woman.
 Hecatonchires Hundred-handed giants.
 Hibagon The Japanese equivalent of Bigfoot.
 Hitotsume-kozou A Yōkai that takes on the appearance of a bald, one-eyed child.
 Hobgoblins Mischievous household spirits.
 Imp Small mischievous spirits.
 Jenny Greenteeth A green-skinned river hag.
 Jiangshi A being in Chinese legends and folklore similar to zombie or vampire.
 Jotuns A Norse mythological race that live in Jötunheimr.
 Kappa A turtle-like yōkai which is about the size of a child.
 Kobalos An ancient Greek equivalent to a goblin.
 Manananggal A self-segmenting humanoid which preys on humans.
 Mangkukulam A person employing or using Kulam.
 Mummy A deceased human or animal whose skin and organs have been preserved.
 Nukekubi Rokurokubi whose heads come off and float about.
 Orcs Humanoids with grey or green skin and tusks.
 Ogre / Ogress Large, grotesque humanoids.
 Oni Yōkai which are similar to ogres/demons.
 Poltergeist Ghosts known for causing physical disturbances.
 Pugot A mythical fiend found in the Ilocos region.
 Rokurokubi Yōkai with long necks or removable heads.
 Samebito A humanoid with inky black skin, emerald green eyes, a demonic face, and a beard like a dragon's.
 Selkie A Scottish mythical creature that resembles a seal in the water but assumes human form on land.
 Succubus / Incubus Seductive demons.
 Titan Gigantic humanoids.
 Tiyanak A vampiric creature in Philippine mythology that imitates the form of a child.
 Troll Large, grotesque humanoids.
 Trow Short, ugly spirits.
 Undine Female water spirits.
 Wechuge Cannibal said to be a person, monster, or a demonic presence who has been possessed or overwhelmed. In return, being too strong. Related to the regions of Canada.
 Wraith An evil spirit who is said to haunt people through negative emotions
 Yama-uba A monstrous crone with cannibalistic tendencies.
 Yeren A legendary creature said to be an as yet undiscovered hominid residing in the remote mountainous forested regions of western Hubei.
 Yeti An ape-like entity taller than an average human said to inhabit the Himalayan region of Nepal, Bhutan and Tibet. 
 Yowie A hominid reputed to live in the Australian wilderness.
 Yuki-onna A spirit or yōkai in Japanese folklore associated with snow.
 Zombie An undead human which preys on the living.

Temporary form humans
 Ala A female demon that brings bad weather to farms.
 Aswang Shapeshifting Philippine ghouls.
Bak Assamese aqueous creature that can take human form after killing them.
 Changeling Fairy child that had been left in place of a human child stolen by the fairies.
 Dokkaebi A mythical being in Korean folklore or fairy tales. Although usually frightening, it could also represent a humorous, grotesque-looking ogre or goblin.
 Doppelgänger A look-alike or double of a living person.
 Empusa A demigoddess of Greek mythology.
 Encantado A mythical river dolphin.
 Ghost A lost soul or spirit that can be good or evil.
 Jorōgumo A spider that can change its appearance into that of a seductive woman.
 Kitsune, Huli Jing and Kumiho Fox spirits.
 Kushtaka A shape-shifting otter creature found in the folklore of the Tlingit and Tsimshian people.
 Lamia A beautiful, child-eating demon.
 Manananggal A self-segmenting humanoid which preys on humans.
 Mangkukulam A person employing or using hexes (kulam).
 Rokurokubi Yōkai with long necks or heads which come off.
 Selkie Scottish creatures which live as seals in the sea and shed their skin to become human when on land.
 Skin-walker A type of witch who has the ability to turn into an animal, or to disguise themselves as an animal.
 Spriggan Grotesque forest spirits.
 Tengu Legendary creatures with human and bird features.
 Werebear A Ursidae therianthropic creature.
 Werecat A feline therianthropic creature. 
 Werehyena A Hyaenidae therianthropic creature.
 Weretiger A feline therianthropic creature.
 Werewolf A canine therianthropic creature.
 Vampire A being from folklore who subsists by feeding on the life essence (generally in the form of blood) of the living.

See also 
Anthropomorphism/Personification
Angel

Lists
List of cryptids
List of fictional apes
List of hybrid creatures in mythology
List of legendary creatures by type

References

Sources

External links